HR 178 is a probable binary star in the constellation Andromeda. Located approximately  distant, it is an evolved Am star with a combined apparent magnitude of 6.06, meaning that it can only be seen with the naked eye on dark, clear nights. The star is suspected of variability, possibly varying between magnitudes 6.04 and 6.06. The variable magnitude period of HD 3883 is about 9.17 min.

The spectrum of HR 178 has been extensively studied for establishing element abundances in the evolved Am stars. It is given a spectral class of kA5hF1mF2, meaning its spectral type is A5, F1, or F2, depending on the particular spectral lines examined. The evolutionary stage of the star, and its mass determined from comparison with theoretical evolutionary tracks, is not precisely determined.

HR 178 has been suspected of being a binary star since 1938 when its spectrum was interpreted as being composite.  The pair were resolved using speckle interferometry in 1983.  The companion is modelled to be between 1.5 and 3 magnitudes fainter than the primary star.  Although there have since been several failed attempts to resolve the pair, a tentative orbit has been calculated with a period of 21.26 years and an eccentricity of 0.5.

References

Andromeda (constellation)
003883
Am stars
0178
Suspected variables
003269
Durchmusterung objects